The total number of Kurds in Istanbul is estimated variously from 3 to 4 million. Because Istanbul is widely accepted to house the largest Kurdish population in any city in the world, it is often dubbed as the biggest Kurdish city. The influx of Kurds to Istanbul was also motivated by the forced depopulation of Kurdish villages during the Kurdish Turkish conflict.

Demographics

Total population 
The Kurdish population in early 20th century is estimated at roughly 10 thousand people, who were composed of ayans and their families but also some laborers.

In 1995, the Kurdish Human Rights Watch estimated that the Kurds in Istanbul numbered ca. 2 million. In 1996, Servet Mutlu estimated that the Kurds were 8.16% (594,000) of Istanbul instead of the often stated 1.5 million. In 1998, the German Foreign Ministry stated that there were 3 million Kurds in Istanbul. In 1997, American diplomat John Tirman regarded a PKK official's claim of 4 million Kurds in Istanbul as "exaggerated."

Neighborhoods with Kurdish communities 
Karayolları, Gaziosmanpaşa: Kurdish majority
Gazi, Gaziosmanpaşa: mixed
Esenyurt
Tarlabaşı
Fatih

History
The first Kurdish cultural and political associations were established in Istanbul. During the reign of Abdulhamid II (r. 1876–1909) the Kurds began producing literature on the condition of the Kurds in Istanbul. In 1918, Kurdish intellectuals established the Association for the Rise of the Kurds in Istanbul. 

In the 1990s Kurds evicted from their villages by the Turkish military have settled in Esenyurt, Istanbul. In March 1995 Kurdish riots broke out in Istanbul.

Culture 
Kurds in Istanbul have played an important role in establishing Kurdish theatre scene in the country. Evicted from their homeland Kurdistan, the Kurds of Esenyurt perceive it as a "lived space". They often watched the Kurdish television broadcast from Europe Med TV.

Organizations
Kurdish Institute of Istanbul

See also
Minorities in Turkey

References

Kurds in Turkey
Ethnic groups in Istanbul